William Lawrence "Larry" Harrison is a Canadian politician, who was elected to the Nova Scotia House of Assembly in the 2013 provincial election. A member of the Progressive Conservative Party of Nova Scotia, he represents the electoral district of Colchester-Musquodoboit Valley.

He was re-elected in the 2017 and 2021 provincial elections.

Electoral record

|-
 
|Progressive Conservative
|Larry Harrison 
|align="right"|3,304 
|align="right"|42.27
|align="right"|
|-
 
|New Democratic Party
|Gary Burrill
|align="right"|2,293 
|align="right"|29.33 
|align="right"|
|-
 
|Liberal
| Tom Martin
|align="right"|2,220 
|align="right"|28.40 
|align="right"|
|}

References

Year of birth missing (living people)
Living people
Progressive Conservative Association of Nova Scotia MLAs
People from Colchester County
21st-century Canadian politicians